Gard or Gord (archaeology). A Slavic term for "town", "city" or "castle." It is of Pomeranian origin and is in use in the contemporary Kashubian language. It has survived in such Pomeranian geographical names as:

 Stargard in West Pomerania
 Starogard Gdański in Eastern Pomerania
 Nowogard in West Pomerania
 Białogard in West Pomerania

Slavic toponyms